The Beggar-Laddie is a traditional English ballad existing in several variants. It was collected by Francis James Child as Child ballad 280 (Roud 119).

Synopsis

A man tells a woman that he is a beggar, making his living from spindles or similar items.  She loves him and follows him.  After a time, she finds it very hard, but then he takes her on to his father's hall, or sometimes his brother's.  His brothers express envy of his bride, and she gains a husband of high birth.

First editions 
The first known record, probably, dates from 1805; it was included in the Old Lady's Collection. Other early versions were collected in the D. Kinloch's MS and C. Motherwell's  MS (both written before 1850). The first publication of the song could be found in Christie's Traditional Ballad Airs (1876, I).

See also
The Jolly Beggar
Dugall Quin
Lizie Lindsay
Glasgow Peggie
Bonny Lizie Baillie

References

External links
The Beggar-Laddie

Child Ballads
Year of song unknown
Songwriter unknown